The Calgary Roughnecks are a lacrosse team based in Calgary playing in the National Lacrosse League (NLL). The 2015 season is the 14th in franchise history.

Regular season

Final standings

Game log

Regular season

Playoffs

Roster

Transactions

Trades

Entry Draft
The 2014 NLL Entry Draft took place on September 22, 2014. The Roughnecks made the following selections:

See also
2015 NLL season

References

Calgary
Calgary Roughnecks seasons
Calgary Roughnecks